"(You Don't Have To) Paint Me a Picture" is a song written by Roger Tillison, Leon Russell, and Snuff Garrett and performed by Gary Lewis & the Playboys.  It reached #9 in Canada, #15 on the Billboard Hot 100, and #58 in Australia in 1966. It was featured on their 1966 album, (You Don't Have To) Paint Me a Picture.

The song was produced by Snuff Garrett and arranged by Leon Russell.

References

1966 songs
1966 singles
Songs written by Leon Russell
Songs written by Snuff Garrett
Gary Lewis & the Playboys songs
Song recordings produced by Snuff Garrett
Liberty Records singles